Irrotational flow occurs where the curl of the velocity of the fluid is zero everywhere. That is when

Similarly, if it is assumed that the fluid is incompressible:

Then, starting with the continuity equation:

The condition of incompressibility means that the time derivative of the density is 0, and that the density can be pulled out of the divergence, and divided out, thus leaving the continuity equation for an incompressible system:

Now, the Helmholtz decomposition can be used to write the velocity as the sum of the gradient of a scalar potential and as the curl of a vector potential. That is:

Note that imposing the condition that  implies that

The curl of the gradient is always 0. Note that the curl of the curl of a function is only uniformly 0 for the vector potential being 0 itself. So, by the condition of irrotational flow:

And then using the continuity equation , the scalar potential can be substituted back in to find Laplace's Equation for irrotational flow:

Note that the laplace equation is a well-studied linear partial differential equation. Its solutions are infinite; however, most solutions can be discarded when considering physical systems, as boundary conditions completely determine the velocity potential.

There is a great amount of overlap with electromagnetism when solving this equation in general, as the Laplace equation also models the electrostatic potential in a vacuum.

There are many reasons to study irrotational flow, among them;
Many real-world problems contain large regions of irrotational flow.
It can be studied analytically.
It shows us the importance of boundary layers and viscous forces.
It provides us tools for studying concepts of lift and drag.

See also
Irrotational vector fields
Irrotational vortices
Potential flow around a circular cylinder

References

Fluid mechanics